Ioana Lorena Diaconescu (born 30 June 1979, in Bucharest) is a former freestyle swimmer from Romania, who represented her native country at two consecutive Summer Olympics, starting in 1996 in Atlanta. In 2000, at the European LC Championships in Helsinki, Finland, she was on the women's relay team, that won the gold medal in the 4×200 m freestyle.

External links
 Profile on Romanian Olympic Committee

1979 births
Living people
Olympic swimmers of Romania
Romanian female freestyle swimmers
Sportspeople from Bucharest
Swimmers at the 1996 Summer Olympics
Swimmers at the 2000 Summer Olympics
European Aquatics Championships medalists in swimming
Universiade medalists in swimming
Universiade gold medalists for Romania
Universiade silver medalists for Romania
Medalists at the 1999 Summer Universiade